Elkins is a ghost town in Houston County, Texas. United States.  It was established around 1900. The town was named after William Eli Elkins, superintendent of a nearby coal mine.

External links
Elkins, TX at the Handbook of Texas Online

Geography of Houston County, Texas
Ghost towns in East Texas